The following is a partial list of notable theoretical physicists. Arranged by century of birth, then century of death, then year of birth, then year of death, then alphabetically by surname. For explanation of symbols, see Notes at end of this article.

Ancient times
 Thales (c. 624 – c. 546 BCE)
 Pythagoras^* (c. 570 – c. 495 BCE)
 Democritus° (c. 460 – c. 370 BCE)
 Aristotle‡ (384–322 BCE)
 Archimedesº* (c. 287 – c. 212 BCE)
 Hypatia^ªº (c. 350–370; died 415 AD)

Middle Ages
 Al Farabi  (c. 872 – c. 950)
 Ibn al-Haytham  (c. 965 – c. 1040)
 Al Beruni  (c. 973 – c. 1048)
 Omar Khayyám  (c. 1048 – c. 1131)
 Nasir al-Din Tusi (1201–1274)
 Jean Buridan  (1301 – c. 1359/62)
 Nicole Oresme  (c. 1320 – 1325 –1382)
 Sigismondo Polcastro (1384–1473)

15th–16th century
 Nicolaus Copernicusº (1473–1543)

16th century and 16th–17th centuries
 Gerolamo Cardano (1501–1576)
 Tycho Brahe (1546–1601)
 Giordano Bruno (1548–1600)
 Galileo Galileiº* (1564–1642)
 Johannes Keplerº (1571–1630)
 Benedetto Castelli (1578–1643)
 René Descartes‡^ (1596–1650)
 Bonaventura Cavalieri (1598–1647)

17th century
 Pierre de Fermat (1607–1665)
 Evangelista Torricelli (1608–1647)
 Giovanni Alfonso Borelli (1608–1679)
 Francesco Maria Grimaldi (1618–1663)
 Blaise Pascal^ (1623–1662)
 Erhard Weigel (1625–1699)
 Christiaan Huygens^ (1629–1695)

17th–18th centuries
 Vincenzo Viviani (1622–1703)
 Isaac Newton^*º (1642–1727)
 Gottfried Leibniz^ (1646–1716)
 Jacob Bernoulli (1655–1705)
 Edmond Halley (1656–1742)
 Luigi Guido Grandi (1671–1742)
 Jakob Hermann (1678–1733)
 Jean-Jacques d'Ortous de Mairan (1678–1771)
 Nicolaus II Bernoulli (1695–1726)
 Pierre Louis Maupertuis (1698–1759)
 Daniel Bernoulli (1700–1782)

18th century
 Leonhard Euler^ (1707–1783)
 Vincenzo Riccati (1707–1785)
 Mikhail Lomonosov (1711–1765)
 Laura Bassiª* (1711–1778)
 Roger Joseph Boscovich (1711–1787)
 Johann Samuel König (1712–1757)
 Alexis Clairaut (1713–1765)
 Jean le Rond d'Alembert (1717–1783)

18th–19th centuries
 Franz Aepinus (1724–1802)
 Henry Cavendish (1731–1810)
 Charles Coulomb (1736–1806)
 Joseph Lagrange^º (1736–1813)
 Pierre-Simon Laplace (1749–1827)
 Jurij Vega (1754–1802)
 John Dalton^ (1766–1844)
 Joseph Fourier^ (1768–1830)
 Thomas Young‡* (1773–1829)
 Jean-Baptiste Biot (1774–1862)
 Étienne-Louis Malus (1775–1812)
 André-Marie Ampère (1775–1836)
 Carl Friedrich Gauss^ (1777–1855)
 Siméon Denis Poisson (1781–1840)
 Giovanni Antonio Amedeo Plana (1781–1864)
 Friedrich Wilhelm Bessel (1784–1846)
 Claude-Louis Navier (1785–1836)
 François Arago (1786–1853)
 Augustin-Jean Fresnel (1788–1827)
 Georg Ohm (1789–1854)
 Augustin-Louis Cauchy (1789–1857)
 Félix Savart (1791–1841)
 Ottaviano-Fabrizio Mossotti (1791–1863)
 Gaspard-Gustave de Coriolis (1792–1843)
 George Green^ (1793–1841)
 Michel Chasles (1793–1880)
 Gabrio Piola (1794–1850)
 Gabriel Lamé (1795–1870)
 Nicolas Léonard Sadi Carnot (1796–1832)
 Nikolai Brashman (1796–1866)
 Andreas von Ettingshausen (1796–1878)
 Jean Léonard Marie Poiseuille (1797–1869)
 Franz Ernst Neumann (1798–1895)
 Benoît Paul Émile Clapeyron (1799–1864)

19th century
 Mikhail Ostrogradsky (1801–1862)
 Carl Gustav Jacob Jacobi (1804–1851)
 Viktor Bunyakovsky (1804–1889)
 William Hamilton^º (1805–1865)
 Samuel Earnshaw (1805–1888)
 Julius Weisbach (1806–1871)
 Joseph Liouville (1809–1882)
 Auguste Bravais (1811–1863)
 Osip Ivanovich Somov (1815–1876)
 Charles-Eugène Delaunay (1816–1872)
 Jonathan Homer Lane (1819–1880)
 William John Macquorn Rankine (1820–1872)
 Pafnuty Chebyshev (1821–1894)
 Hermann von Helmholtz‡† (1821–1894)
 Johann Josef Loschmidt (1821–1895)
 August Krönig (1822–1879)
 Rudolf Clausius (1822–1888)
 August Davidov (1823–1885)
 Gustav Kirchhoff (1824–1887)
 Bernhard Riemann (1826–1866)
 Ludvig Lorenz (1829–1891)
 James Clerk Maxwell (1831–1879)
 Johann Bauschinger (1834–1893)
 Josef Stefan (1835–1893)
 Eugen von Lommel (1837–1899)
 Carlo Alberto Castigliano (1847–1884)
 Sofia Kovalevskaya (1850–1891)
 Pierre Henri Hugoniot (1851–1887)
 Heinrich Hertz* (1857–1894)

19th–20th centuries

 Sir George Stokes, 1st Baronet (1819–1903)
 William Thomson, 1st Baron Kelvin* (1824–1907)
 Rodolphe Radau (1835–1911)
 Christian Otto Mohr (1835–1918)
 Johannes Diderik van der Waals (1837–1923)
 George William Hill (1838–1914)
 Ernst Mach (1838–1916)
 Viktor von Lang (1838–1921)
 J. Willard Gibbs†^ (1839–1903)
 Ernst Abbe (1840–1905)
 Osborne Reynolds (1842–1912)
  (1842–1914)
 John William Strutt, 3rd Baron Rayleigh (1842–1919)
 Joseph Valentin Boussinesq (1842–1929)
 Ludwig Boltzmann (1844–1906)
 Nikolay Umov (1846–1915)
 Nikolay Zhukovsky (1847–1921)
 Diederik Korteweg (1848–1941)
 Horace Lamb (1849–1934)
 Woldemar Voigt (1850–1919)
 Oliver Heaviside (1850–1925)
 Jacobus Kapteyn (1851–1922)
 Arthur Schuster (1851–1934)
 Jacobus Henricus van 't Hoff (1852–1911)
 John Henry Poynting (1852–1914)
 Orest Khvolson (1852–1934)
 Hendrik Lorentz (1853–1928)
 Henri Poincaré (1854–1912)
 Alfred Barnard Basset (1854–1930)
 Emil Cohn (1854–1944)
 Marcel Brillouin (1854–1948)
 Max Margules (1856–1920)
 Carl Runge (1856–1927)
  (1856–1937)
 Aleksandr Lyapunov (1857–1918)
 Samuel Oppenheim (1857–1928)
 Konstantin Tsiolkovsky (1857–1935)
 Joseph Larmor (1857–1942)
 Maurice Couette (1858–1943)
 Max Planck (1858–1947)
 Svante Arrhenius (1859–1927)
 Karl Heun (1859–1929)
 Vito Volterra (1860–1940)
 Pierre Duhem (1861–1916)
 Emil Wiechert (1861–1928)
 Robert Emden (1862–1940)
 Paul Drude (1863–1906)
 Arthur Gordon Webster (1863–1923)
 Augustus Edward Hough Love (1863–1940)
 Hermann Minkowski (1864–1909)
 Vladimir Steklov (1864–1926)
 Wilhelm Wien (1864–1928)
 Walther Nernst (1864–1941)
 Pierre Weiss (1865–1940)
 Pieter Zeeman (1865–1943)
 Jacques Hadamard (1865–1963)
 Gustav de Vries (1866–1934)
 Martin Kutta (1867–1944)
 Arnold Sommerfeld (1868–1951)
 Gustav Mie (1868–1957)
 Sergey Chaplygin (1869–1942)
 Nikolai Kasterin (1869–1947)
 Alfred-Marie Liénard (1869–1958)
 Louis Bachelier (1870–1946)
 Ernest Rutherford (1871–1937)
 Émile Jouguet (1871–1943)
 Boris Galerkin (1871–1945)
 Martin Knudsen (1871–1949)
 Émile Borel (1871–1956)
 Marian Smoluchowski (1872–1917)
 Paul Langevin (1872–1946)
 Ludwik Silberstein (1872–1948)
 Théophile de Donder (1872–1957)
 Karl Schwarzschild (1873–1916)
 Alfred Robb (1873–1936)
 Tullio Levi-Civita (1873–1941)
 Constantin Carathéodory (1873–1950)
 E. T. Whittaker (1873–1956)
 Friedrich Hasenöhrl (1874–1915)
 Vagn Walfrid Ekman (1874–1954)
 Hans Reissner (1874–1967)
 Max Abraham (1875–1922)
 Louis Napoleon George Filon (1875–1937)
 Gilbert N. Lewis (1875–1946)
 Ludwig Prandtl (1875–1953)
 Tatyana Ehrenfest-Afanasevaª (1876–1964)
 James Jeans° (1877–1946)
 Eduard Grüneisen (1877–1949)
 Georg Hamel (1877–1954)
 Walther Ritz (1878–1909)
 Marcel Grossmann (1878–1936)
 Lise Meitner (1878–1968)
 Stephen Timoshenko (1878–1972)
 Leonid Mandelstam (1879–1944)
 Carl Wilhelm Oseen (1879–1944)
 Albert Einsteinº (1879–1955)
 Nikolay Krylov (1879–1955)
 Max von Laue (1879–1960)
 Otto Sackur (1880–1914)
 Paul Ehrenfest (1880–1933)
 Leonard Ornstein (1880–1941)
 Nikolai Papaleksi (1880–1947)
 Alfred J. Lotka (1880–1949)
 Abram Ioffe (1880–1960) 
 Gunnar Nordström (1881–1923)
 Jun Ishiwara (1881–1947)
 Walter Rogowski (1881–1947)
 Richard Tolman° (1881–1948)
 Gustav Herglotz (1881–1953)
 Irving Langmuir (1881–1957)
 Theodore von Kármán (1881–1963)
 Erwin Madelung (1881–1972)
 Emmy Noether^ª (1882–1935)
 Arthur Eddington (1882–1944)
 Max Born (1882–1970)
 Richard von Mises (1883–1953)
 Paul Sophus Epstein (1883–1966)
 Ludwig Hopf (1884–1939)
 Arthur Erich Haas (1884–1941)
 George David Birkhoff (1884–1944)
 David Enskog (1884–1947)
 Peter Debye (1884–1966)
 Philipp Frank (1884–1966)
 Vsevolod Frederiks (1885–1944)
 Naum Idelson (1885–1951)
 Theodor Kaluza (1885–1954)
 Hermann Weyl (1885–1955)
 Niels Bohr (1885–1962)
 Victor Robertovich Bursian (1886–1945)
 Rudolf Seeliger (1886–1965)
 Friedrich Kottler (1886–1965)
 Paul Lévy (1886–1971)
 Geoffrey Taylor (1886–1975)
 Walter H. Schottky (1886–1976)
 Richard Becker (1887–1955)
 Erwin Schrödinger (1887–1961)
 Charles Galton Darwin (1887–1962)
 Adriaan Fokker (1887–1972)
 Erich Kretschmann (1887–1973)
 Hendrika Johanna van Leeuwen (1887–1974)
 Waloddi Weibull (1887–1979)
 Alexander Weinstein (1887–1979)
 Ralph Walter Graystone Wyckoff (1887–1994)
 Alexander Friedmann (1888–1925)
 Walther Kossel (1888–1956)
 Viktor Trkal (1888–1956)
 Wilhelm Lenz (1888–1957)
 Antonio Signorini (1888–1963)
 Frits Zernike (1888–1966)
 Sydney Chapman (1888–1970)
 Joseph Proudman (1888–1975)
 Alfred Landé (1888–1976)
 Hans Thirring (1888–1976)
 Paul Peter Ewald (1888–1985)
 Ralph H. Fowler (1889–1944)
 Léon Brillouin (1889–1969)
 Wojciech Rubinowicz (1889–1974)
 Harry Nyquist (1889–1976)
 Edwin C. Kemble (1889–1984)
 Yoshio Nishina (1890–1951)
 Yurii Aleksandrovich Krutkov (1890–1952)
 Josef Lense (1890–1985)
 Arthur March (1891–1957)
 George Barker Jeffery (1891–1957)
 Michael Polanyi (1891–1976)
 Nikoloz Muskhelishvili (1891–1976)
 Harold Jeffreys (1891–1989)
 Arthur Holly Compton (1892–1962)
 Karl Herzfeld (1892–1978)
 Louis de Broglie (1892–1987)
 Walter Gordon (1893–1939)
 Meghnad Saha (1893–1956)
 Erwin Fues (1893–1970)
 Cornelius Lanczos (1893–1974)
 Francis Murnaghan (1893–1976)
 Adolf Kratzer (1893–1983)
 Yakov Frenkel (1894–1952)
 Hans Kramers (1894–1952)
 John Lennard-Jones (1894–1954)
 Aleksandr Khinchin (1894–1959)
 Norbert Wiener (1894–1964)
 Georges Lemaître (1894–1966)
 Satyendra Nath Bose (1894–1974)
 Oskar Klein (1894–1977)
 Hugo Tetrode (1895–1931)
  (1895–1951)
 Karel Niessen (1895–1967)
 Igor Tamm (1895–1971)
 Hans Falkenhagen (1895–1971)
 Vasily Vladimirovich Shuleikin (1895–1979)
 Jan Burgers (1895–1981)
 Aldo Pontremoli (1896–1928)
 William Reginald Dean (1896–1973)
 Boris Podolsky (1896–1966)
 Erich Hückel (1896–1980)
 Robert S. Mulliken (1896–1986)
 Nikolay Semyonov (1896–1986)
 Friedrich Hund (1896–1997)
 Myron Mathisson (1897–1940)
 Douglas Hartree (1897–1958)
 Lewi Tonks (1897–1971)
 Ivan Stranski (1897–1979)
 John Lighton Synge (1897–1995)
 Ali Moustafa Mosharafa (1898–1950)
 Ronald Wilfred Gurney (1898–1953)
 Leó Szilárd (1898–1964)
 Leopold Infeld (1898–1968)
  (1898–1974)
 Vladimir Fock (1898–1974)
 Gregor Wentzel (1898–1978)
 Isidor Isaac Rabi (1898–1988)
 Ivar Waller (1898–1991)
  (1899–1967)
 Edmund Clifton Stoner (1899–1968)
 John Hasbrouck Van Vleck (1899–1980)
 Gregory Breit (1899–1981)
  (1899–1982)
 Lothar Wolfgang Nordheim (1899–1985)
 Gleb Wataghin (1899–1986)
 Pelageya Polubarinova-Kochina (1899–1999)
 Wilhelm Cauer (1900–1945)
 Fritz London (1900–1954)
 Wolfgang Pauli (1900–1958)
 Walter Tollmien (1900–1968)
 William V. Houston (1900–1968)
 John C. Slater (1900–1976)
 Mikhail Lavrentyev (1900–1980)
 Vladimir Rojansky (1900–1981)
 George Eugene Uhlenbeck (1900–1988)
  (1900–1991)
 Ernst Ising (1900–1998)

20th century

 Nikolai Kochin (1901–1944)
 Aleksandr Andronov (1901–1952)
 Enrico Fermi* (1901–1954)
 Werner Heisenberg (1901–1976)
 Werner Braunbeck (1901–1977)
 Carl Wagner (1901–1977)
 Anatoliy Lure (1901–1980)
 Karl Bechert (1901–1981)
 Henry Eyring (1901–1981)
 Kurt Otto Friedrichs (1901–1982)
 Grete Hermann (1901–1984)
 Yuri Rumer (1901–1985)
 Edwin Albrecht Uehling (1901–1985)
 Francis Perrin (1901–1992)
 Linus Pauling (1901–1994)
 William Allis (1901–1999)
  (1902–1938)
 Michael Sadowsky (1902–1967)
 Otto Laporte (1902–1971)
 Carl Eckart (1902–1973)
 Edward Condon (1902–1974)
 Samuel Abraham Goudsmit (1902–1978)
 Pascual Jordan (1902–1980)
 Paul Dirac (1902–1984)
 Alfred Kastler (1902–1984)
 Eugene Wigner (1902–1995)
 Katharine Way (1902–1995)
 Hans Hellmann (1903–1938)
 John von Neumann (1903–1957)
 Howard P. Robertson (1903–1961)
 Lars Onsager (1903–1976)
  (1903–1979)
 Helmut Hönl (1903–1981)
 Mikhail Leontovich (1903–1981)
 Philip M. Morse (1903–1985)
 Andrey Kolmogorov (1903–1987)
 Guido Beck (1903–1988)
 Sydney Goldstein (1903–1989)
 Llewellyn Thomas (1903–1992)
 Bartel Leendert van der Waerden (1903–1996)
 Bertha Swirles (1903–1999)
 Meredith Gwynne Evans (1904–1952)
 Robert Oppenheimer* (1904–1967)
 George Gamow‡° (1904–1968)
  (1904–1970)
 Léon Rosenfeld (1904–1974)
 Otto Robert Frisch (1904–1979)
 Christian Møller (1904–1980)
 Walter Heitler (1904–1981)
 Joseph Edward Mayer (1904–1983)
 Torsten Gustafson (1904–1987)
  (1904–1990)
 Walter M. Elsasser (1904–1991)
 Dmitri Ivanenko (1904–1994)
 Ralph Kronig (1904–1995)
 Yulii Khariton (1904–1996)
 Louis Néel (1904–2000)
 George Placzek (1905–1955)
 Felix Bloch (1905–1983)
 Ernst Stueckelberg (1905–1984)
 Herbert Fröhlich (1905–1991)
 Clarence Zener (1905–1993)
 Nevill Francis Mott (1905–1996)
  (1905–1996)
 Matvei Bronstein (1906–1938)
 Ettore Majorana (1906–1938)
 Maria Goeppert-Mayerª (1906–1972)
 Eugene Feenberg (1906–1977)
  (1906–1977)
 Sin-Itiro Tomonaga (1906–1979)
 William Houlder Zachariasen (1906–1979)
 Fritz Sauter (1906–1983)
 Louis Rosenhead (1906–1984)
 Banesh Hoffmann (1906–1986)
  (1906–1987)
 Alan Herries Wilson (1906–1995)
 John Gamble Kirkwood (1907–1959)
 J. Hans D. Jensen (1907–1973)
  (1907–1979)
 Hermann Arthur Jahn (1907–1979)
 Hideki Yukawa (1907–1981)
 Herbert Jehle (1907–1983)
 Wendell H. Furry (1907–1984)
 Rudolf Peierls (1907–1995)
 Achilles Papapetrou (1907–1997)
 George Rankine Irwin (1907–1998)
 William Rarita (1907–1999)
 Leonid I. Sedov (1907–1999)
 Wu Ta-You (1907–2000)
  (1908–1938)
 Felix Gantmacher (1908–1964)
 Lev Landau (1908–1968)
 Anatoly Vlasov (1908–1975)
 Lyubomir Krastanov (1908–1977)
 Harrie Massey (1908–1983)
 Moses Blackman (1908–1983)
 Șerban Țițeica (1908–1985)
 Valentine Bargmann (1908–1989)
 Ilya Frank (1908–1990)
 Solomon Mikhlin (1908–1990)
 John Bardeen (1908–1991)
 Milton S. Plesset (1908–1991)
  (1908–1993)
 Moisey Markov (1908–1994)
 Josef Meixner (1908–1994)
 Hannes Alfvén (1908–1995)
 Viktor Ambartsumian (1908–1996)
  (1908–1996)
 Sergei Mikhailovich Rytov (1908–1996)
 Sergey Khristianovich (1908–2000)
 Hans Euler (1909–1941)
 Homi J. Bhabha (1909–1966)
 Stanislaw Ulam (1909–1984)
 Friedrich Bopp (1909–1987)
 William Penney, Baron Penney (1909–1991)
 Nikolay Bogolyubov (1909–1992)
 Gian Carlo Wick (1909–1992)
 Nathan Rosen (1909–1995)
 Richard Duffin (1909–1996)
  (1909–1997)
 Robert Serber (1909–1997)
 Hendrik Casimir (1909–2000)
 David A. Frank-Kamenetskii (1910–1970)
 Aleksei Zinovyevich Petrov (1910–1972)
 Charles Coulson (1910–1974)
 Tjalling Koopmans (1910–1985)
 Arseny Sokolov (1910–1986)
 Anatoly Dorodnitsyn (1910–1994)
 Subrahmanyan Chandrasekhar (1910–1995)
  (1910–1998)
 José Enrique Moyal (1910–1998)
 Sergei Vonsovsky (1910–1998)
 Arnold Nordsieck (1911–1971)
 ª (1911–1977)
 Mstislav Keldysh (1911–1978)
 Carlo Cattaneo (1911–1979)
 Gregory Hugh Wannier (1911–1983)
 Klaus Fuchs (1911–1988)
 Arkady Migdal (1911–1991)
 Paul Weiss (1911–1991)
 Walter Franz (1911–1992)
 Richard Buckingham (1911–1994)
 William Alfred Fowler (1911–1995)
 Raymond Lyttleton (1911–1995)
 Menahem Max Schiffer (1911–1997)
 Nicholas Kemmer (1911–1998)
 Aleksander Akhiezer (1911–2000)
 R. E. Siday (1912–1956)
 Heinrich Welker (1912–1981)
  (1912–1990)
 Konrad Bleuler (1912–1992)
 Mikhail Volkenshtein (1912–1992)
 Alexander Davydov (1912–1993)
 Siegfried Flügge (1912–1997)
 Martin Schwarzschild (1912–1997)
 Aleksandr Aleksandrov (1912–1999)
 Sidney Dancoff (1913–1951)
 Hartland Snyder (1913–1962)
 Isaak Pomeranchuk (1913–1966)
  (1913–1977)
 Ludwig Waldmann (1913–1980)
  (1913–1987)
 Frederik Belinfante (1913–1991)
 Bruno Pontecorvo (1913–1993)
 Józef Lubański (1914–1946)
  (1914–1974)
 Henry Primakoff (1914–1983)
 Mark Kac (1914–1984)
 Yakov Zeldovich (1914–1987)
 Bernard Lippmann (1914–1988)
 Mário Schenberg (1914–1990)
 Lyman Spitzer (1914–1997)
 George Michael Volkoff (1914–2000)
 Robert R. Wilson (1914–2000)
 Leonard I. Schiff (1915–1971)
 Ely Eugene Bell (1915–1973)
  (1915–1977)
 Theodore Holstein (1915–1985)
 Evgeny Lifshitz (1915–1985)
 Sudhansu Datta Majumdar (1915–1997)
 Leonid Biberman (1915–1998)
 Oleg Firsov (1915–1998)
 André Lichnerowicz (1915–1998)
 Nicholas Metropolis (1915–1999)
 John D. Eshelby (1916–1981)
 Elliott Waters Montroll (1916–1983)
 Iosif Shklovsky (1916–1985)
  (1916–1989)
 Robert Marshak (1916–1992)
 Kirill Tolpygo (1916–1994)
 Robert Dicke (1916–1997)
 Robert G. Sachs (1916–1999)
 Per-Olov Löwdin (1916–2000)
 John Alexander Simpson (1916–2000)
 Theodore H. Berlin (1917–1962)
 Imre Fényes (1917–1977)
 Ilya Lifshitz (1917–1982)
 Yevgeny Zababakhin (1917–1984)
 Solomon Pekar (1917–1985)
 James Rainwater (1917–1986)
 Veniamin Levich (1917–1987)
 Eli Sternberg (1917–1988)
  (1917–1990)
 David Bohm (1917–1992)
  (1917–1992)
 Dmitry Zubarev (1917–1992)
 Herman Feshbach (1917–2000)
 Richard Feynman (1918–1988)
 Res Jost (1918–1990)
 Harold Hopkins (1918–1994)
 Kirill Gurov (1918–1994)
 Julian Schwinger (1918–1994)
 Max Dresden (1918–1997)
 Irving Segal (1918–1998)
 James Hamilton (1918–2000)
 Abraham Pais (1918–2000)
 Paul Taunton Matthews (1919–1987)
 Herbert Callen (1919–1993)
 Clifford Truesdell (1919–2000)
 Ian Sneddon (1919–2000)
 Julius Ashkin (1920–1982)
 Ryogo Kubo (1920–1995)
 Gerhart Lüders (1920–1995)
 Herbert S. Green (1920–1999)
 George Batchelor (1920–2000)
 Sergei Tyablikov (1921–1968)
 Sigurd Zienau (1921–1976)
 Alfred Schild (1921–1977)
 Andrei Sakharov (1921–1989)
 John M. Blatt (1921–1990)
 Feza Gürsey (1921–1992)
 Eduardo R. Caianiello (1921–1993)
  (1921–1993)
 Igor Ternov (1921–1996)
 Melville S. Green (1922–1979)
 Ernst G. Straus (1922–1983)
  (1922–1988)
  (1922–1991)
 Lawrence Biedenharn (1922–1996)
 Jens Lindhard (1922–1997)
 Edwin Thompson Jaynes (1922–1998)
 Claude Bloch (1923–1971)
 Ernest Helmut Sondheimer (1923–1973)
 Kurt Symanzik (1923–1983)
 Harold Grad (1923–1986)
 Joaquin Mazdak Luttinger (1923–1997)
 Gregory Pikus (1923–1998)
 Louis Michel (1923–1999)
  (1924–1981)
 Léon Van Hove (1924–1990)
 Gregory Garibian (1924–1991)
 Juan José Giambiagi (1924–1996)
 Harry Lehmann (1924–1998)
 Efim Fradkin (1924–1999)
 John Clive Ward (1924–2000)
 Sam Treiman (1925–1999)
  (1925–2000)
 Gunnar Källén (1926–1968)
 Rem Khokhlov (1926–1977)
 Stuart Thomas Butler (1926–1982)
  (1926–1986)
 Eugene P. Gross (1926–1991)
 Abdus Salam (1926–1996)
  (1926–1998)
 Dennis Sciama (1926–1999)
 Rudolph Max Sternheimer (1926–2000)
 Aneesur Rahman (1927–1987)
 Yuri Yappa (1927–1998)
 Rolf Landauer (1927–1999)
 Robert Mills (1927–1999)
 John Stewart Bell (1928–1990)
 Richard E. Cutkosky (1928–1993)
 Gurgen Askaryan (1928–1997)
  (1929–1988)
 Roland Dobrushin (1929–1995)
 David Klyshko (1929–2000)
  (1929–2000)
 Hugh Everett (1930–1982)
 Vladimir Gribov (1930–1997)
 Ruslan Stratonovich (1930–1997)
 Felix Berezin (1931–1980)
 John Hubbard (1931–1980)
 Revaz Dogonadze (1931–1985)
  (1931–1986)
 Luciano Fonda (1931–1998)
  (1932–1991)
 Walter Marshall (1932–1996)
 J. J. Sakurai (1933–1982)
 Leopoldo Máximo Falicov (1933–1995)
 Euan J. Squires (1933–1996)
 Shivaramakrishnan Pancharatnam (1934–1969)
 M. A. B. Beg (1934–1990)
 Alexey Andreevich Anselm (1934–1998)
 Vadim Berezinskii (1935–1980)
 Peter A. Carruthers (1935–1997)
 Victor Popov (1937–1994)
 Karl Kraus (1938–1988)
 Raphael Høegh-Krohn (1938–1988)
 Roger Dashen (1938–1995)
 Claude Itzykson (1938–1995)
  (1938–1998)
 Arkady Aronov (1939–1994)
  (1939–2000)
 Herbert H. Chen (1942–1987)
 Dan Walls (1942–1999)
 Giuliano Preparata (1942–2000)
 Joël Scherk (1946–1980)
 Elizabeth Gardnerª (1957–1988)
 Vadim Knizhnik (1962–1987)

20th–21st century 

 Hans Bethe° (1906–2005)
 Melba Phillips (1907–2004)
 László Tisza (1907–2009)
 Victor Weisskopf (1908–2002)
 Edward Teller (1908–2003)
 Arthur Geoffrey Walker (1909–2001)
 Werner Romberg (1909–2003)
  (1911–2001)
 Leslie Howarth (1911–2001)
 Frederick Seitz (1911–2008)
 John Wheeler (1911–2008)
 Ugo Fano (1912–2001)
 Naum Meiman (1912–2001)
 Evgenii Feinberg (1912–2005)
 Markus Fierz (1912–2006)
 Carl Friedrich von Weizsäcker (1912–2007)
 Harald Keres (1912–2010)
 Maurice Pryce (1913–2003)
 Willis Lamb (1913–2008)
  (1914–2004)
 James Stark Koehler (1914–2006)
 Conyers Herring (1914–2009)
 Anatole Abragam (1914–2011)
 Fred Hoyle (1915–2001)
 Peter Bergmann (1915–2002)
  (1915–2003)
 Philip Morrison (1915–2005)
 P. R. Wallace (1915–2006)
 Ivan Supek (1915–2007)
 David Turnbull (1915–2007)
 Jan Korringa (1915–2015)
 Charles H. Townes (1915–2015)
 Harold Neville Vazeille Temperley (1915–2017)
  (1916–2006)
 Frank Nabarro (1916–2006)
 Vitaly Ginzburg (1916–2009)
 Robert F. Christy (1916–2012)
 Paolo Budinich (1916–2013)
 Charles Kittel (1916–2019)
 Ilya Prigogine (1917–2003)
 Leonid Brekhovskikh (1917–2005)
 Yurii Mitropolskiy (1917–2008)
 Morikazu Toda (1917–2010)
 Arthur Iberall (1918–2002)
 David George Kendall (1918–2007)
  (1918–2007)
 Theodore A. Welton (1918–2010)
 Clemens C. J. Roothaan (1918–2019)
 Dirk ter Haar (1919–2002)
 Rolf Hagedorn (1919–2003)
 Hermann Bondi (1919–2005)
 Huang Kun (1919–2005)
 Wolfgang K. H. Panofsky (1919–2007)
 Peter Westervelt (1919–2015)
 Isaak Khalatnikov (1919–2021)
 Brian Pippard (1920–2008)
 Kenneth Le Couteur (1920–2011)
 Cyril Domb (1920–2012)
 James Bruce French (1921–2002)
 Felix Villars (1921–2002)
 Giovanni Rossi Lomanitz (1921–2003)
 Francis E. Low (1921–2007)
  (1921–2007)
 Akiva Yaglom (1921–2007)
 Andrew M. Gleason (1921–2008)
 Nico van Kampen (1921–2013)
 Eugen Merzbacher (1921–2013)
 Albert Messiah (1921–2013)
 Jacques Friedel (1921–2014)
  (1921–2014)
 Takeo Matsubara (1921–2014)
 Yoichiro Nambu (1921–2015)
 Louis Witten (born 1921)
 Peter Mazur (1922–2001)
 Melvin Lax (1922–2002)
  William Cochran (1922–2003)
 Behram Kurşunoğlu (1922–2003)
 Norman Myles Kroll (1922–2004)
 Herbert Goldstein (1922–2005)
 Karen Ter-Martirosian (1922–2005)
 Aage Bohr (1922–2009)
 Arthur Wightman (1922–2013)
 Marvin Leonard Goldberger (1922–2014)
 Rudolf Haag (1922–2016)
  (1922–2017)
 Emil Wolf (1922–2018)
 Richard J. Eden (1922–2021)
 Hans Frauenfelder (1922–2022)
 Chen-Ning Yang (born 1922)
 Bryce DeWitt (1923–2004)
 Christopher Longuet-Higgins (1923–2004)
 Alladi Ramakrishnan (1923–2008)
  (1923–2008)
 Harold Lewis (1923–2011)
 Peter A. Wolff (1923–2013)
 Bruno Zumino (1923–2014)
 Walter Kohn (1923–2016)
 H. Pierre Noyes (1923–2016)
 Ivor Robinson (1923–2016)
 Henri Cabannes (1923–2016)
 Spartak Belyaev (1923–2017)
 Philip Warren Anderson (1923–2020)
 Freeman Dyson (1923–2020)
 Laurie Brown (born 1923)
 Yvonne Choquet-Bruhat (born 1923)
 Pierre Aigrain (1924–2002)
  (1924–2002)
 Albert Hibbs (1924–2003)
 Amal Kumar Raychaudhuri (1924–2005)
 Evan O'Neill Kane (1924–2006)
 Edwin Ernest Salpeter (1924–2008)
  (1924–2009)
 Benoit Mandelbrot (1924–2010)
 Yasushi Takahashi (1924–2013)
 Keith Brueckner (1924–2014)
 David Pines (1924–2018)
 Geoffrey Chew (1924–2019)
 Yuri Orlov (1924–2020)
 Jerald L. Ericksen (1924–2021)
 Suraj N. Gupta (born 1924)
 Nicolaas Marinus Hugenholtz (born 1924)
 John Pople (1925–2004)
 Ted Taylor (1925–2004)
 Renfrey Potts (1925–2005)
 John Ziman (1925–2005)
 Richard Dalitz (1925–2006)
 Martin David Kruskal (1925–2006)
 Yuval Ne'eman (1925–2006)
 Albert Overhauser (1925–2011)
 Martin Gutzwiller (1925–2014)
 Norman Rostoker (1925–2014)
 John David Jackson (1925–2016)
 Walter Noll (1925–2017)
 Roy J. Glauber (1925–2018)
 George G. Hall (1925–2018)
 Joshua N. Goldberg (1925–2020)
 Toichiro Kinoshita (born 1925)
 Nándor Balázs (1926–2003)
 Richard Allan Ferrell (1926–2005)
 Erdal İnönü (1926–2007)
 Karl Rebane (1926–2007)
 Nikolai Borisovich Delone (1926–2008)
 George Klaus Horton (1926–2009)
  (1926–2009)
  (1926–2010)
 Gerald E. Brown (1926–2013)
 Anatoly Logunov (1926–2015)
 Engelbert Schücking (1926–2015)
 Sidney Drell (1926–2016)
  (1926–2019)
 Jerome K. Percus (1926–2021)
  (1926–2022)
 Ben Roy Mottelson (1926–2022)
 Kenneth W. Ford (born 1926)
 Peter Lax (born 1926)
 Tsung-Dao Lee (born 1926)
  (born 1926)
 György Marx (1927–2002)
 Eugene Irving Blount (1927–2005)
  (1927–2008)
 Erhard Scheibe (1927–2010)
 Michel Baranger (1927–2014)
 Walter Thirring (1927–2014)
 Gerald B. Whitham (1927–2014)
 Joseph L. Birman (1927–2016)
  (1927–2017)
  (1927–2017)
 Elihu Abrahams (1927–2018)
 Michael Woolfson (1927–2019)
  (1927–2020)
 Yuri Raizer (1927–2021)
 Eugene Parker (1927–2022)
 Murray Gerstenhaber (born 1927)
 Hermann Haken (born 1927)
 Emmanuel Rashba (born 1927)
  (born 1927)
 Sergio Fubini (1928–2005)
 Arnold Kosevich (1928–2006)
 Hans-Jürgen Treder (1928–2006)
  (1928–2007)
  (1928–2007)
 Boris Chirikov (1928–2008)
 Robert Kraichnan (1928–2008)
 Reinhard Oehme (1928–2010)
 Michael Tinkham (1928–2010)
 Robert Brout (1928–2011)
 Anthony Milner Lane (1928–2011)
 Richard Arnowitt (1928–2014)
 Andrew Sessler (1928–2014)
 Robert Zwanzig (1928–2014)
 Samuel Edwards (1928–2015)
 Abner Shimony (1928–2015)
  (1928–2015)
 Felix Pirani (1928–2015)
 John W. Cahn (1928–2016)
 Stephen Gasiorowicz (1928–2016)
 Kerson Huang (1928–2016)
 Stanley Mandelstam (1928–2016)
 Dmitry Shirkov (1928–2016)
 Wolfhart Zimmermann (1928–2016)
 Alexei Alexeyevich Abrikosov (1928–2017)
 Silvan S. Schweber (1928–2017)
  (1928–2017)
 Roger Elliott (1928–2018)
 Louis A. Girifalco (1928–2018)
  (1928–2019)
 Eyvind Wichmann (1928–2019)
 Alan Lidiard (1928–2020)
 Tatiana Birshteinª (1928–2022)
 Isaac B. Bersuker (born 1928)
 Franco Bassani (1929–2008)
 Jürgen Ehlers (1929–2008)
 James Philip Elliott (1929–2008)
 Vitaly Shafranov (1929–2014)
 Lev Okun (1929–2015)
 David Finkelstein (1929–2016)
 Lev Gor'kov (1929–2016)
 Norman Zabusky (1929–2018)
 Philippe Choquard (1929–2018)
 Murray Gell-Mann (1929–2019)
 Ezra T. Newman (1929–2021)
  (1929–2021)
 Kurt Gottfried (1929–2022)
 Asoke Nath Mitra (1929–2022)
 Semyon Gershtein (1929–2023)
  (born 1929)
 George B. Field (born 1929)
 Peter Higgs (born 1929)
 Friedwardt Winterberg (born 1929)
 Joshua Zak (born 1929)
 Antonino Zichichi (born 1929)
  (1930–2002)
  (1930–2005)
 Albert Tavkhelidze (1930–2010)
  (1930–2012)
 Riazuddin (1930–2013)
 Marvin D. Girardeau (1930–2015)
 Raymond Stora (1930–2015)
 Mildred Dresselhaus (1930–2017)
 George Herbert Weiss (1930–2017)
 Lodewijk Woltjer (1930–2019)
 Richard M. Weiner (1930–2020)
  (1930–2021)
 John Polkinghorne (1930–2021)
 David M. Brink (1930–2021)
 Jun Kondo (1930–2022)
 Leon Cooper (born 1930)
 Aleksandr Gurevich (born 1930)
  (born 1930)
 Volker Heine (born 1930)
 Lawrence Paul Horwitz (born 1930)
 Martin Karplus (born 1930)
 Joel Lebowitz (born 1930)
  (born 1930)
 Viktor Maslov (born 1930)
 John Clayton Taylor (born 1930)
 Siegfried Grossmann (born 1930)
  (1931–2006)
 Valentin Turchin (1931–2010)
 Richard Liboff (1931–2014)
 Tullio Regge (1931–2014)
  (1931–2015)
 Vladimir Braginsky* (1931–2016)
 Leonid Keldysh (1931–2016)
  (1931–2016)
  (1931–2018)
 George Sudarshan (1931–2018)
 John Robert Schrieffer (1931–2019)
 Loup Verlet (1931–2019)
 Fred Cummings (1931–2019)
 Igor Dzyaloshinskii (1931–2021)
 Michael Fisher (1931–2021)
 Martinus Veltman (1931–2021)
  (1931–2022)
  (1931–2022)
 Stanley Deser (born 1931)
 Alexei A. Maradudin (born 1931)
 Mark Nelkin (born 1931)
 Luis de la Peña (born 1931)
 Roger Penrose (born 1931)
 Valery Pokrovsky (born 1931)
 Roland Omnès (born 1931)
 Anatoly Larkin (1932–2005)
 Radu Bălescu (1932–2006)
 Tom Kibble (1932–2016)
 H. Dieter Zeh (1932–2018)
 Mark Azbel (1932–2020)
 Philippe Nozières (1932–2022)
 Huzihiro Araki (1932–2022)
 Yakir Aharonov (born 1932)
 Claude Bouchiat (born 1932)
 François Englert (born 1932)
 Sheldon Glashow (born 1932)
 John R. Klauder (born 1932)
 Elliott H. Lieb (born 1932)
 Charles W. Misner (born 1932)
 Stuart A. Rice (born 1932)
 Roald Sagdeev (born 1932)
 John Dirk Walecka (born 1932)
 John Boardman (born 1932)
 Rainer K. Sachs (born 1932)
  (born 1932)
  (1933–2005)
 Moshe Carmeli (1933–2007)
 Maurice Jacob (1933–2007)
  (1933–2008)
 John Quinn (1933–2018)
 Steven Weinberg (1933–2021)
 Lev Pitaevskii (1933–2022)
 Roger Balian (born 1933)
 Steven Frautschi (born 1933)
 Jeffrey Goldstone (born 1933)
 John Hopfield (born 1933)
 James Charles Phillips (born 1933)
 Gerald Harris Rosen (born 1933)
 Andrzej Trautman (born 1933)
 Tai Tsun Wu (born 1933)
 Victor Emery (1934–2002)
 Julius Wess (1934–2007)
  (1934–2011)
 Manuel Cardona (1934–2014)
  (1934–2015)
 Ludvig Faddeev (1934–2017)
 Pierre Hohenberg (1934–2017)
 Michael Nauenberg (1934–2019)
 David J. Thouless (1934–2019)
  (1934–2021)
 Hiranmay Sen Gupta (1934–2022)
 Morton Gurtin (1934–2022)
 Jacques Villain (1934–2022)
 James Bjorken (born 1934)
 Lowell Brown (born 1934)
 Sebastian Doniach (born 1934)
 John G. Cramer (born 1934)
 Rodney Loudon (born 1934)
 Albert Schwarz (born 1934)
 Fred Alan Wolf (born 1934)
 Roy Kerr (born 1934)
 James S. Langer (born 1934)
 George Zaslavsky (1935–2008)
 Nicola Cabibbo (1935–2010)
 Walter Greiner (1935–2016)
 Oktay Sinanoğlu (1935–2015)
 Giancarlo Ghirardi (1935–2018)
 Gordon Baym (born 1935)
 Carl H. Brans (born 1935)
 Francesco Calogero (born 1935)
 Marvin L. Cohen (born 1935)
 Richard M. Friedberg (born 1935)
 Hanoch Gutfreund (born 1935)
 N. David Mermin (born 1935)
 Harald J.W. Mueller-Kirsten (born 1935)
 Igor Dmitriyevich Novikov (born 1935)
  (born 1935)
 David Ruelle (born 1935)
 Yakov Sinai (born 1935)
 Evgeny Velikhov (born 1935)
 Herbert Wagner (born 1935)
 David Fairlie (born 1935)
 Basil Hiley (born 1935)
 Jim Peebles (born 1935)
  (born 1935)
 Kenneth G. Wilson (1936–2013)
 Gerald Guralnik (1936–2014)
 Peter Freund (1936–2018)
  (1936–2020)
 Abdul Qadeer Khan (1936–2021)
  (born 1936)
 Klaus Hepp (born 1936)
 Rudolf Muradyan (born 1936)
 Harold Puthoff (born 1936)
 Peter Fulde (born 1936)
 Alexander Patashinski (born 1936)
 William G. Hoover (born 1936)
  (born 1936)
 Noor Muhammad Butt (born 1936)
 Ray Streater (born 1936)
 Eduard Prugovečki (1937–2003)
 Praveen Chaudhari (1937–2007)
 Sidney Coleman (1937–2007)
 Vladimir Arnold (1937–2010)
 David Olive (1937–2012)
 Leo Kadanoff (1937–2015)
  (1937–2017)
 Jill Bonner (1937–2021)
 Wolfgang Götze (1937–2021)
 Gerald Mahan (1937–2021)
 Pantur Silaban (1937–2022)
 Alexander Fetter (born 1937)
 C. R. Hagen (born 1937)
 Iosif Khriplovich (born 1937)
 Leonid Pastur (born 1937)
 Tung-Mow Yan (born 1937)
 George Zweig (born 1937)
 Arthur Jaffe (born 1937)
  (1938–2004)
 Balázs Győrffy (1938–2012)
 C. V. Vishveshwara (1938–2017)
 Neil Ashcroft (1938–2021)
 Andrzej Kossakowski (1938–2021)
 Alexander Animalu (born 1938)
 Boris Arbuzov (born 1938)
 A. P. Balachandran (born 1938)
 Édouard Brézin (born 1938)
 Vitaly Efimov (born 1938)
 Alexei L. Efros (born 1938)
 Vladimir P. Krainov (born 1938)
 Anthony James Leggett (born 1938)
 Jayant Narlikar (born 1938)
 Peter van Nieuwenhuizen (born 1938)
 Sergei Novikov (born 1938)
 Leonard Parker (born 1938)
 Lu Jeu Sham (born 1938)
 Daniel I. Khomskii (born 1938)
 Boris Struminsky (1939–2003)
  1939–2012)
 Roger Cowley (1939–2015)
 Yoseph Imry (1939–2018)
 Ratko Janev (1939–2019)
 Giuseppe Pastori Parravicini (1939–2019)
 James M. Bardeen (1939–2022)
 Andrei Slavnov (1939–2022)
 Stephen L. Adler (born 1939)
 Alexander F. Andreev (born 1939)
 Carlo Becchi (born 1939)
 Daniel Z. Freedman (born 1939)
 James Hartle (born 1939)
 Roman Jackiw (born 1939)
 Pran Nath (born 1939)
 Ramamurti Rajaraman (born 1939)
 Marlan Scully (born 1939)
 Vladimir E. Zakharov (born 1939)
 George F. R. Ellis (born 1939)
 Stuart S. Antman (born 1939)
 Sergio Albeverio (born 1939)
 Francisco José Ynduráin (1940–2008)
 Alexei Fridman (1940–2010)
 Stanislav Mikheyev (1940–2011)
 Marshall Stoneham (1940–2011)
 Oscar Lanford (1940–2013)
 Emilio Del Giudice (1940–2014)
 Lev Lipatov (1940–2017)
 Edward Tryon (1940–2019)
 Toshihide Maskawa (1940–2021)
 Miguel Ángel Virasoro (1940–2021)
 Göran Lindblad (1940–2022)
 Stanley Brodsky (born 1940)
 Juansher Chkareuli (born 1940)
 Mikhail Dyakonov (born 1940)
 Eleftherios Economou (born 1940)
 Uriel Frisch (born 1940)
 Peter Grassberger (born 1940)
  (born 1940)
 Haim Harari (born 1940)
 John Iliopoulos (born 1940)
 Brian Josephson (born 1940)
 Dmitri Ryutov (born 1940)
 Leonard Susskind (born 1940)
 Kip Thorne (born 1940)
 Igor Tyutin (born 1940)
  (born 1940)
 Alan Harold Luther (born 1940)
 Brosl Hasslacher (1941–2005)
 Guido Altarelli (1941–2015)
 Thomas Appelquist (born 1941)
 William A. Bardeen (born 1941)
 Vladimir Belinski (born 1941)
 Michael Berry (born 1941)
 David Gross (born 1941)
 Bertrand Halperin (born 1941)
 Luciano Maiani (born 1941)
 Jeffrey Mandula (born 1941)
 Peter Minkowski (born 1941)
 Holger Bech Nielsen (born 1941)
 Peter Pulay (born 1941)
 T. V. Ramakrishnan (born 1941)
 John Henry Schwarz (born 1941)
 Jerrold E. Marsden (1942–2010)
 Stephen Hawking (1942–2018)
 Eugène Cremmer (1942–2019)
 Alexander Belavin (born 1942)
 Curtis Callan (born 1942)
 Victor Sergeevich Fadin (born 1942)
 Crispin Gardiner (born 1942)
 Robert Geroch (born 1942)
 David J. Griffiths (born 1942)
 Konrad Osterwalder (born 1942)
 Yves Pomeau (born 1942)
  (born 1942)
 Michael Shur (born 1942)
 Arkady Vainshtein (born 1942)
 Gabriele Veneziano (born 1942)
 Michael C. Reed (born 1942)
 Martin Rees (born 1942)
 Brandon Carter (born 1942)
 Paolo Di Vecchia (born 1942)
 Ganesan Srinivasan (born 1942)
 Jeffrey Bub (born 1942)
  (1943–2020)
 Lars Brink (1943–2022)
 Amnon Aharony (born 1943)
 V. Balakrishnan (born 1943)
 Carl M. Bender (born 1943)
 Charles Bennett (born 1943)
 Paul Frampton (born 1943)
 Harald Fritzsch (born 1943)
 Renata Kallosh (born 1943)
 J. Michael Kosterlitz (born 1943)
 John Perdew (born 1943)
 Richard H. Price (born 1943)
 Pierre Ramond (born 1943)
 Rashid Sunyaev (born 1943)
 Erio Tosatti (born 1943)
 Jean Zinn-Justin (born 1943)
 Helen Quinn (born 1943)
 Davison Soper (born 1943)
 Bryan Webber (born 1943)
 Mitchell Feigenbaum (1944–2019)
 Kurt Binder (born 1944)
 Makoto Kobayashi (born 1944)
 Alexander Kuzemsky (born 1944)
 Rabindra Mohapatra (born 1944)
 Anthony Ichiro Sanda (born 1944)
 Boris Shklovskii (born 1944)
 Michael Thorpe (born 1944)
 Rod Crewther (1945–2020)
 Sergio Ferrara (born 1945)
 Peter Goddard (born 1945)
 Alexander Migdal (born 1945)
 Michele Parrinello (born 1945)
 Alexander Markovich Polyakov (born 1945)
 Nikolai Shakura (born 1945)
 Israel Michael Sigal (born 1945)
 W. G. Unruh (born 1945)
 Bernard de Wit (born 1945)
 Jakob Yngvason (born 1945)
 Anthony Zee (born 1945)
 Stephen A. Fulling (born 1945)
 John Kogut (born 1945)
  (born 1945)
 Vladimir Petrovich Mineev (born 1945)
 Carsten Peterson (born 1945)
 Gennady Chibisov (1946–2008)
 Viacheslav Belavkin (1946–2012)
 Vladimir Fortov (1946–2020)
 Lorenz S. Cederbaum (born 1946)
 İsmail Hakkı Duru (born 1946)
 Michael Green (born 1946)
 Gerardus 't Hooft (born 1946)
 André Neveu (born 1946)
 Charles Thorn (born 1946)
 Grigory E. Volovik (born 1946)
  (born 1946)
 Jean-Bernard Zuber (born 1946)
 Barry Simon (born 1946)
 Gary Gibbons (born 1946)
 Eli Yablonovitch (born 1946)
 Jürg Fröhlich (born 1946)
 Thomas Spencer (born 1946)
  (born 1946)
 George Sterman (born 1946)
 Herbert Spohn (born 1946)
 Clifford Martin Will (born 1946)
 Bernard F. Schutz (born 1946)
  (born 1946)
 William E. Caswell (1947–2001)
 Jacob Bekenstein (1947–2015)
 Claudio Bunster (born 1947)
 Roberto Car (born 1947)
 John Cardy (born 1947)
 Howard Georgi (born 1947)
 Alan Guth (born 1947)
 John Joannopoulos (born 1947)
 Michio Kaku (born 1947)
 Walter Selke (born 1947)
  (born 1947)
 Henry Tye (born 1947)
 Robert Wald (born 1947)
 Erick Weinberg (born 1947)
 Anna N. Żytkow (born 1947)
 Ulf Lindström (born 1947)
 Thomas Curtright (born 1948)
 Gabor Forgacs (born 1948)
 Eugene Levich (born 1948)
 Andrei Linde (born 1948)
 Dimitri Nanopoulos (born 1948)
 Don Page (born 1948)
 Giorgio Parisi (born 1948)
 Douglas Ross (born 1948)
 Michael F. Shlesinger (born 1948)
  (born 1948)
 Alexei Starobinsky (born 1948)
 Toshiki Tajima (born 1948)
  (born 1948)
 Bennie Ward (born 1948)
  (1949–2012)
 Nihat Berker (born 1949)
 Tekin Dereli (born 1949)
 Ayşe Erzan (born 1949)
  (born 1949)
 Steven Gwon Sheng Louie (born 1949)
 Richard G. Palmer (born 1949)
 Hugh David Politzer (born 1949)
 Itamar Procaccia (born 1949)
 Mikhail Shifman (born 1949)
 Alexander Vilenkin (born 1949)
 Joel Feldman (born 1949)
 John C. Collins (born 1949)
 R. Keith Ellis (born 1949)
 Abhay Ashtekar (born 1949)
 Shing-Tung Yau (born 1949)
 Pierre Fayet (born 1949)
  (1950–2021)
 Carlton M. Caves (born 1950)
 Sylvester James Gates (born 1950)
 Robert B. Laughlin (born 1950)
 Berndt Müller (born 1950)
 Stephen Parke (born 1950)
 Johann Rafelski (born 1950)
 Goran Senjanovic (born 1950)
 Kyriakos Tamvakis (born 1950)
 Steven Girvin (born 1950)
 James Binney (born 1950)
 Amir Caldeira (born 1950)
 Sergiu Klainerman (born 1950)
 Louise Dolan (born 1950)
 Thors Hans Hansson (born 1950)
 Shuichi Nosé (1951–2005)
 Demetrios Christodoulou (born 1951)
 Ignazio Ciufolini (born 1951)
 Thibault Damour (born 1951)
 F. Duncan Haldane (born 1951)
 Christopher T. Hill (born 1951)
 Allan H. MacDonald (born 1951)
 Alexei Smirnov (born 1951)
 Frank Wilczek (born 1951)
 Edward Witten (born 1951)
 Cosmas Zachos (born 1951)
 Wojciech H. Zurek (born 1951)
 Philip Candelas (born 1951)
 Michael Peskin (born 1951)
 Denis Evans (born 1951)
 Alexei Zamolodchikov (1952–2007)
 John D. Barrow (1952–2020)
 Ian Affleck (born 1952)
 Bernard Derrida (born 1952)
 Paul Steinhardt (born 1952)
 Horst Stöcker (born 1952)
 Christof Wetterich (born 1952)
 Alexander Zamolodchikov (born 1952)
 Peter Zoller (born 1952)
 Savas Dimopoulos (born 1952)
 Gerard Peter Lepage (born 1952)
 Bernard Julia (born 1952)
 James Stirling (1953–2018)
 Mikhail Voloshin (1953–2020)
 Ali Chamseddine (born 1953)
 David Deutsch (born 1953)
 Boris Feigin (born 1953)
  (born 1953)
 Stephan W. Koch (born 1953)
 John Preskill (born 1953)
 Sankar Das Sarma (born 1953)
 Daniel L. Stein (born 1953)
 José W. F. Valle (born 1953)
 Mark B. Wise (born 1953)
 Peter Guy Wolynes (born 1953)
 Richard Jozsa (born 1953)
 Marie Farge (born 1953)
 Joseph Polchinski (1954–2018)
 Alexandre Bouzdine (born 1954)
 Mikhail Feigelman (born 1954)
  (born 1954)
 Lawrence M. Krauss (born 1954)
 Michael Loss (born 1954)
 David Vanderbilt (born 1954)
 Julia Yeomans (born 1954)
 Barton Zwiebach (born 1954)
 Clifford Taubes (born 1954)
 Antti Kupiainen (born 1954)
 F. J. Duarte (born 1954)
 Reinhard F. Werner (born 1954)
 Leonard Mlodinow (born 1954)
 Valery Rubakov (1955–2022)
 Boris Altshuler (born 1955)
 Dietrich Belitz (born 1955)
 Gilles Brassard (born 1955)
 Augusto Sagnotti (born 1955)
 Lee Smolin (born 1955)
 Alan Sokal (born 1955)
 Andrew Strominger (born 1955)
 Jeffrey A. Harvey (born 1955)
 Zlatko Tesanovic (1956–2012)
 Kurt Kremer (born 1956)
 David Lindley (born 1956)
 Dieter Lüst (born 1956)
 Fulvio Melia (born 1956)
 Viatcheslav Mukhanov (born 1956)
 Carlo Rovelli (born 1956)
 Susan M. Scottª (born 1956)
 Nathan Seiberg (born 1956)
 Ashoke Sen (born 1956)
 Sunil Mukhi (born 1956)
 Sheldon Katz (born 1956)
 Boris Shraiman (born 1956)
  (1957–2009)
 Thanu Padmanabhan (1957–2021)
 Mehran Kardar (born 1957)
 Mikhail Katsnelson (born 1957)
 Joseph Lykken (born 1957)
 Marc Mézard (born 1957)
 Peter Woit (born 1957)
 Ryan Rohm (born 1957)
 Wolfgang P. Schleich (born 1957)
 Mark Bowick (born 1957)
 Piers Coleman (born 1958)
 David Tannor (born 1958)
 Neil Turok (born 1958)
 Giovanni Felder (born 1958)
 Nicolai Reshetikhin (born 1958)
 Emil Martinec (born 1958)
  (born 1959)
 Stephen Wolfram (born 1959)
 Steven R. White (born 1959)
 Horng-Tzer Yau (born 1959)
 Carlo Beenakker (born 1960)
 David Drabold (born 1960)
 Raymond Laflamme (born 1960)
 Cumrun Vafa (born 1960)
 Zvi Bern (born 1960)
 John C. Baez (born 1961)
 Jacques Distler (born 1961)
 Michael R. Douglas (born 1961)
 Gian F. Giudice (born 1961)
  (born 1961)
 Subir Sachdev (born 1961)
 Erik Verlinde (born 1961)
 Xiao-Gang Wen (born 1961)
 Antoine Georges (born 1961)
 Jan Philip Solovej (born 1961)
 Lance J. Dixon (born 1961)
 Jean-Philippe Bouchaud (born 1962)
 Marcela Carena (born 1962)
 Igor Klebanov (born 1962)
 Lisa Randallª (born 1962)
 Carlos E.M. Wagner (born 1962)
 Ezra Getzler (born 1962)
 Mark Alford (born 1962)
 Gerald B. Cleaver (born 1963)
 Brian Greene (born 1963)
 Alexei Kitaev (born 1963)
 Sandip Trivedi (born 1963)
 Shoucheng Zhang (1963–2018)
 Gia Dvali (born 1964)
 Miguel Alcubierre (born 1964)
 Raman Sundrum (born 1964)
 Lars Bildsten (born 1964)
  (born 1965)
 Antony Valentini (born 1965)
 Sean M. Carroll (born 1966)
 Stephen Hsu (born 1966)
 Matthias Gaberdiel (born 1966)
 Durmus A. Demir (born 1967)
 João Magueijo (born 1967)
 Rajesh Gopakumar (born 1967)
 Natalia Berloff (born 1968)
 Jeff Forshaw (born 1968)
 Antony Garrett Lisi (born 1968)
 Juan Maldacena (born 1968)
 Vijay Balasubramanian (born 1969)
 Laura Mersini-Houghtonª (born 1969)
 Dam Thanh Son (born 1969)
 Shamit Kachru (born 1970)
 Eva Silverstein (born 1970)
 Mikhail Lukin (born 1971)
 Vlatko Vedral (born 1971)
 Anton Kapustin (born 1971)
 Steven Gubser (1972–2019)
 Nima Arkani-Hamed (born 1972)
 Shiraz Minwalla (born 1972)
 Maxim Chernodub (born 1973)
 Luboš Motl (born 1973)
 Cédric Villani (born 1973)
 Tommy Ohlsson (born 1973)
 Ashvin Vishwanath (born 1973)
 Egor Babaev (born 1973)
 Yasunori Nomura (born 1974)
 Brian Wecht (born 1975)
 Robert Seiringer (born 1976)
 Anastasia Volovich (born 1976)
 Bianca Dittrichª (born 1977)
 Davide Gaiotto (born 1977)
 Bogdan Andrei Bernevig (born 1978)
 Katie Mack (born 1981)
 K. S. Babu

Fictional theoretical physicists

 Gordon Freeman
 Eli Vance
 Isaac Kleiner
 Rodney McKay
 Samantha Carterª
 Larry Fleinhardt
 Leonardo Vetra
 Quinn Mallory
 Maximillian Arturo
 Nicholas Rush
 Daniel Faraday
 Catherine Elizabeth Halsey
 Milo Rambaldi
 Reed Richards
 Victor Von Doom
 Radek Zelenka
 Sheldon Cooper
 Rosalind and Robert Lutece
 Rick Sanchez

See also 
 List of scientists
 List of physicists

Notes 
 * Experimentalist also
 º Astronomer, astrophysicist or cosmologist also
 ^ Developed new mathematics
 † Contributed to chemistry
 ‡ Contributed to biology
 ª Women in theoretical physics

Theoretical physicists